Blue Ridge Farm may refer to:

Blue Ridge Farm (Greenwood, Virginia),listed on the National Register of Historic Places in Albemarle County, Virginia
Blue Ridge Farm (Upperville, Virginia), a different farm run by Cary Travers Grayson and listed on the National Register of Historic Places in Fauquier County, Virginia